Circus (translit. Tsirk) is a 1936 Soviet melodramatic comedy musical film. It was directed by Grigori Aleksandrov and Isidor Simkov at the Mosfilm studios. In his own words, it was conceived as "an eccentric comedy...a real side splitter."

Starring the glamorous and immensely popular Lyubov Orlova (Aleksandrov's wife), the first recognized star of Soviet cinema and a gifted singer, the film contains several songs which instantly became Soviet classics. The most famous is the "Song of the Motherland" (Широка страна моя родная). ISWC code for film music: T-926.406.620-8

The film was based on a comedy written by Ilf and Petrov and Valentin Kataev and performed by Moscow music hall, Under the Circus Dome (Под куполом цирка), which was seen and liked by Aleksandrov. They made the play into the plot, but during the initial film shooting they went to America. Upon return, they disliked the director's interpretation, and after a conflict they abandoned the work, forbade the mention of their names in the credits, and further work on the plot was continued by Isaac Babel.

Plot

Orlova plays an American circus artist who, after giving birth to a black baby (played by James Lloydovich Patterson), immediately becomes a victim of racism and is forced to stay in the circus, but finds refuge, love and happiness in the USSR.

Marion Dixon, a popular American circus artist is forced to flee for her life with her son, to escape a lynch mob in a provincial American town. The fate of the father is not mentioned, but it is implied that he was lynched. Dixon is taken under the wing of Franz von Kneishitz, a sinister German theatrical agent whose mustache and mannerisms resemble those of Adolf Hitler. Kneishitz blackmails Dixon into becoming his lover while exploiting her and in one scene beats her quite savagely.

Dixon is only kept alive by her love for her son Jimmy, and when she plays in Moscow as a guest performer, she is portrayed as spiritually broken. At the Moscow circus, the circus director Ludvig hires the Arctic explorer Ivan Petrovich Martynov to design a new circus act to top Dixon's "Trip to the Moon" act. Ludvig's fiery daughter Rayechka has a tempestuous relationship with her boyfriend Skameikin. Despite his mission to design an act better than her act, Martynov and Dixon fall in love, which attracts Kneishitz's rage. Dixon wants to stay in Moscow with Martynov, saying she has found happiness again. Kneishitz diverts a love letter from Dixon meant for Martynov to Skameikin, which throws the circus into romantic chaos as Rayechka is furious with Skameikin while Martynov is heartbroken. To escape Rayechka, Skameikin accidentally runs into a lion cage and has to calm the lions with a bouquet of flowers. When Martynov does not respond to her love letter, Dixon nearly leaves Moscow with Kneishitz. By this time, Rayechka has learned the truth and she helps Dixon escape Kneishitz. Martynov and Dixon are late to the circus, forcing Ludvig to perform the top act of 1903, the chudo tekhniki ("miracle of technology"), to amuse the impatient audience. Finally, Martynov and Dixon arrive and perform their "Trip to the Stratosphere" act together.

Kneishitz interrupts the act to tell Dixon to come with him or else he will reveal her secret. When she refuses, Kneishitz delivers a Hitler-like rant about how Dixon has a black son Jimmy, only for the audience to laugh at him. Ludvig tells Kneishitz that the Soviet peoples do not care about racial purity or race at all. Dixon's black son is embraced by friendly Soviet people. Kneishitz tries to seize Jimmy, but the audience unites to save him. Finally, a group of burly Red Army soldiers in the audience block Kneishitz, who cowers in fear and leaves. The movie climaxes with a lullaby being sung to the baby by representatives of various Soviet ethnicities taking turns. The lyrics of the lullaby to Jimmy are sung in Russian, Ukrainian, Yiddish, Uzbek and Georgian. One of the members of the audience is a black American man dressed in a Soviet naval officer's uniform with a Russian wife. The lyrics of The International Lullaby declare: "Son prikhodit na porog/Krepko, krepko spi ty/Sto putei, sto dorog/Dlia tebia otkryty" ("Sleep comes to your doorstep/Sleep very,very soundly/A hundred paths, a hundred doorways/Are open to you"). Dixon and Martynov declare their love for one another while Rayechka and Shameikin become engaged. The film ends with Rayechka and Dixon marching together in the annual May Day parade under banners depicting the faces of Lenin and Stalin. Much of the footage of the May Day parade used in the film was taken from the actual May Day parade of 1935.

The film was digitally colorized in 2011 in Russia.

Cast 

 Lyubov Orlova as Marion Dixon, American actress and circus artist. Her name is a tribute to the actress Marlene Dietrich.
 James Patterson as Jimmy, Marion's baby
 Sergei Stolyarov as Ivan Petrovich Martynov, Soviet performance director
 Pavel Massalsky as Franz von Kneisсhitz, corrupt theatrical agent
 Vladimir Volodin as Ludvig Osipovich, Soviet circus director
 Yevgeniya Melnikova as Rayechka, the director's daughter
 Aleksandr Komissarov as Skameikin
 Nikolai Otto as Charlie Chaplin
 Coretti Arle-Titz as Jimmy's nanny
 Solomon Mikhoels as Lullaby singer

Production and aftermath
 The movie was the most commercially successful Soviet film. Two weeks after the release, it was viewed by 1 million people in Moscow alone.
 In Russia, Solomon Mikhoels's murder in 1948 by the order of Stalin was perceived as a failed movie's message about the danger of chauvinism and anti-Semitism. American researcher Herbert Eagle said: "The scene in the Circus is intended to show that the Soviet people are devoid of racial prejudices. Of course, it was an attack against America and propaganda, but on the other hand, Aleksandrov probably sincerely called for reconciliation, for harmony, hoping that in these terrible times he would awaken conscience in the audience with the means available to him."
 In early 1953, the verses from the lullaby, sung in Yiddish (which were performed by Solomon Mikhoels) were removed. After Stalin's death the verses were restored.
 The well known animal trainer Boris Eder substituted for Aleksandr Komissarov in Skameikin's flower fight with the lions.
 The "Flight to the Moon" stunt coordinated and performed by three Kharkiv inventors where the extreme sports athlete Vera Buslaeva substituted for Lyubov Orlova for the cameras.
 As one of Joseph Stalin's favourite movies Circus was the last film he saw before his death.
 The movie has an in-joke about Mikhail Lermontov's death at the hands of Nikolai Martynov, at that time in the 1930s it was officially revised as a planned political murder ordered by the secret police.
 The movie with an American Catholic protagonist was released one month before the 1936 anti-abortion law. Just after that, America and Americans disappeared from Soviet cinema. Lyubov Orlova had to participate in the anti-abortion law promotion company: "I myself want a child, and I will certainly have one. And it is natural. Life is getting more and more joyful and more fun. The future is even more wonderful. Why not give birth?". In 1941, she adopted Douglas (b. 19 May 1925), Grigori Aleksandrov's son by his first marriage to actress Olga Ivanova (she died during childbirth in June 1941, being married to a famous actor Boris Tenin). He was named after Douglas Fairbanks, he and Mary Pickford visited the Bolshevik state back then and were admired by Grigori and Olga. In 1952, Douglas Aleksandrov was arrested by the MVD on false treason claims and, at 26 in a prison, had suffered his first heart attack before being forcefully renamed to 'Vasilii'. The MVD unsuccessfully wanted him to testify about his father being an American spy. He was released shortly after Stalin's death in 1953.

See also
List of musical films
List of racism-related films

References

External links

Site-museum of Lyubov Orlova Orlova
  Yuri Nikulin on the film Circus

1936 films
Mosfilm films
1930s Russian-language films
Films set in Russia
Soviet black-and-white films
Films about race and ethnicity
Films directed by Grigori Aleksandrov
Circus films
Ilf and Petrov
Films scored by Isaak Dunayevsky
Soviet musical comedy-drama films
1930s musical comedy-drama films
Melodrama films
1936 comedy films
1936 drama films
Films about racism in the United States
Films set in the Soviet Union